Francis Xavier Hurley (February 11, 1903 – April 1976) was an American politician who served as the 17th Massachusetts Auditor and the 46th Treasurer and Receiver-General of Massachusetts. He was a 1924 graduate of Harvard College. Hurley was elected state auditor at the age of 27, making him the youngest person ever elected to statewide office in Massachusetts. He is known for a 1933 report alleging misconduct by the superintendent of Norfolk Prison Colony, now called Massachusetts Correctional Institution – Norfolk.

References 

 

1903 births
1976 deaths
Politicians from Cambridge, Massachusetts
Massachusetts Democrats
Harvard Law School alumni
State auditors of Massachusetts
State treasurers of Massachusetts
20th-century American politicians
Harvard College alumni